La Rondinaia (built 1930) is a villa in Ravello on the Amalfi Coast in southern Italy.

History
Initially, the property was a part of the Villa Cimbrone, owned by Ernest Beckett, 2nd Baron Grimthorpe. His daughter Lucy (1884–1979) had La Rondinaia built around 1930 and began living there. It is built on the edge of a cliff, hence its name "The swallows nest" (rondine means swallow in Italian).

Gore Vidal and Howard Austin
It was owned by American writer Gore Vidal and his partner Howard Austen, from 1972 to 2006, who added a pool and sauna in 1984. While he owned the villa, Vidal hosted Paul Newman, Mick Jagger, Greta Garbo, Princess Margaret, Bruce Springsteen, Tennessee Williams, Italo Calvino and Hillary Clinton. Critic David Cunningham referred to La Rondinaia as "perhaps the last great author's home/artistic salon". It was eventually sold  to Vincenzo Palumbo, a local hotelier.

Recent sale

In popular culture
The villa was one location for the 2004 movie The Life Aquatic with Steve Zissou.

References

Further reading

 . In which the actor describes a visit to La Rondinaia in 2001. 
 . In which the author describes a visit to La Rondinaia.
 

Gore Vidal
Ravello
Villas in Campania
Buildings and structures in the Province of Salerno
Houses completed in 1930
1930 establishments in Italy